Ascanio Turamini (1586 – 2 September 1647) was a Roman Catholic prelate who served as Bishop of Grosseto (1586–1647).

Biography
Ascanio Turamini was born in Siena, Italy in 1586 and ordained a priest on 19 December 1635.
On 2 March 1637, he was appointed during the papacy of Pope Urban VIII as Bishop of Grosseto.
On 15 March 1637, he was consecrated bishop by Francesco Maria Brancaccio, Cardinal-Priest of Santi XII Apostoli, with Giovanni Battista Altieri, Bishop Emeritus of Camerino, and Emilio Bonaventura Altieri, Bishop of Camerino, serving as co-consecrators. 
He served as Bishop of Grosseto until his death on 2 September 1647.

References

External links and additional sources
 (for Chronology of Bishops) 
 (for Chronology of Bishops)  

17th-century Italian Roman Catholic bishops
Bishops appointed by Pope Urban VIII
Bishops of Grosseto
1586 births
1647 deaths